Davidovici  may refer to:

People

Doru Davidovici (1945–1989), Romanian aviator and writer
Robert Davidovici, Romanian violinist

Places

Donji Davidovići, village in the municipality of Bileća, Bosnia and Herzegovina
Gornji Davidovići, village in the municipality of Bileća, Bosnia and Herzegovina